The Father George Kehoe Memorial Award is awarded annually to the U Sports men's ice hockey Coach of the Year as selected by the U Sports Men’s Hockey Coaches Association.

The award is named in honour of the late Rev. George Kehoe, a St. Francis Xavier University alumni and Nova Scotia Sport Hall of Fame inductee who was the Director of Athletics at St. Francis Xavier University for many years.

References

External links
CIS Past Awards 

U Sports ice hockey trophies and awards
Ice hockey coach of the year awards